is a passenger railway station in the city of Tsukuba, Ibaraki, Japan, operated by the third-sector railway operating company Metropolitan Intercity Railway Company. It is numbered "TX20".

Lines
Tsukuba Station is the northern terminus of the 58.3 km Tsukuba Express line from the opposing terminus at Akihabara Station in Tokyo.

Station layout
The station consists of a single island platform situated underground.

Platforms

History
The railway station opened on 24 August 2005. Tsukuba Center bus terminal existed prior to the railway station opening.

Passenger statistics
In fiscal year 2019, the station was used by an average of 18,671 passengers daily (boarding passengers only).

Surrounding area
The station is located at the heart of the "science city" of Tsukuba. It is also situated near the central bus terminal.

Bus services
Tsukuba Center is a bus terminal near Tsukuba Station. Now, there is also a commercial complex named  attached to the bus terminal. The commercial complex is managed by Daiwa Lease. There is also a satellite campus of the University of Tsukuba, which was opened in 2015.

The station has a passenger waiting room and an information desk operated by Kantō Railway, where tickets can be purchased.

Local bus routes 
Routes marked with an asterisk * have service on weekdays only.

Highway bus routes

See also
 List of railway stations in Japan

References

External links

 TX Tsukuba Station
 Timetables of Tsukuba station

Stations of Tsukuba Express
Railway stations in Ibaraki Prefecture
Tsukuba, Ibaraki
Railway stations in Japan opened in 2005